Sir Michael Lawrence Davis (born 15 February 1958) is a British politician and former South African businessman, former chief executive and treasurer of the Conservative Party and the chief executive (CEO) of Xstrata plc, an Anglo-Swiss multinational mining company, until its merger with Glencore in 2013. After leaving Xstrata, he formed the mining venture X2 Resources and, after making substantial donations, became the CEO and treasurer of the British Conservative Party – a post he held until July 2019.

Early life and education
Mick Davis was born to a South African Jewish family on 15 February 1958. He was educated at Theodor Herzl School, Port Elizabeth, South Africa. He has a bachelor of commerce degree from Rhodes University and is a qualified accountant.

Career
Davis was a senior manager with Peat Marwick Mitchell & Co, from 1980 to 1986. Davis was an executive director of the South African state-owned Eskom, one of the world’s largest electricity utilities, before joining Gencor Ltd in 1994. He served as executive chairman of Ingwe Coal Corporation Ltd from 1995, until appointed in July 1997 as Chief Financial Officer and an executive director of Billiton plc. He served as Chief Executive of Xstrata from 2001 but left in 2013, after the company was taken over by Glencore. He subsequently formed the mining venture, X2 Resources, with former colleagues including former Xstrata finance director Trevor Reid and executives Thras Moraitis, Andrew Latham, Ian Pearce and Benny Levene.

Davis has extensive capital markets and corporate transactions experience. During his career, he has raised almost US$40 billion from global capital markets and completed over US$120 billion of corporate transactions. Some of his successes are the creation of the Ingwe Coal Corporation in South Africa; the listing of Billiton on the London Stock Exchange; the merger of BHP and Billiton into the largest diversified mining company in the world; the initial public offering of Xstrata plc on the London Stock Exchange in 2002 and Xstrata's subsequent acquisitions of MIM Holdings and Falconbridge Limited, amongst others and most recently the successful merger of Xstrata and Glencore. Early in 2015 he and his partners successfully closed the X2 Resources fund after raising almost US$6 billion from a combination of sovereign wealth, pension and private equity funds.

Charitable work
From 2009 to 2017 Davis was president of the council of members and chairman of the board of trustees of the Jewish Leadership Council of the United Kingdom, the umbrella body of the largest Jewish charities and Institutions in the UK responsible for the strategic imperatives of UK Jewry. He is also chairman of the Holocaust Memorial Commission of the United Kingdom. He is a trustee of the Foundation and Friends of the Royal Botanic Gardens, Kew, which supports the work of the Royal Botanic Gardens, Kew. Davis is also a member of the Brookings International Advisory Council and a trustee of the Institute of National Security Studies. He is also a trustee of the Davis Foundation

In February 2018 Davis came under criticism for allegedly participating in a cover-up in 2013 of alleged financial impropriety at the Jewish Leadership Council charity where he was Chair. The Jewish Chronicle subsequently published parts of emails by Davis outlining his proposed resolution to have the CEO resign on the grounds of ill health and that he hoped the full details would not be leaked.

Politics 
In 2016, Davis was appointed treasurer of the British Conservative Party. In June 2017, he was also appointed CEO of the party. In October 2017, commentator Iain Dale placed Davis at number 83 in 'The Top 100 Most Influential People on the Right'.

In March 2018, along with David Brownlow, Davis donated money to pay Ben Bradley's legal bills resulting from Bradley's tweet falsely accusing Jeremy Corbyn of "selling British secrets to communist spies in the 1980s". Davis resigned as CEO and Treasurer of the Conservative Party on 24 July 2019.

Ties to Guinean bribery and corporate secrecy scandal
In 2019 it was revealed by Global Witness that the mining firm Niron Metals, of which Davis was director and co-founder, was to take over the mining rights at Zogota in Guinea from the Israeli mining billionaire tycoon Beny Steinmetz' company BSGR after a surprise resolution to the bribery case between BSGR and the Guinean government.

In 2008, BSGR bribed Mamadie Touré, the wife of Guinea’s then-president Lansana Conté, with millions of dollars to enlist her help in obtaining rights to develop one of the world's largest iron ore deposits worth an estimated $10 billion in the Simandou mountains. Once obtaining the rights to prospect the region in December 2008 for $150 million, Steinmetz sold a 51% share to mining conglomerate Vale for $2.5 billion. Under a new president, Alpha Condé, BSGR's rights were revoked in 2014 and a court case was opened against the company by the Guinean government accusing them of bribing Mamadie Touré to obtain the mining rights. In September 2014 BSGR started an international arbitration proceeding against the Republic of Guinea in the International Centre for Settlement of Investment Disputes, challenging the government's decision to revoke its mining rights.

In February 2019, BSGR together with Guinean President Alpha Condé agreed to drop the pending arbitration case and all allegations of wrongdoing. As part of the agreement, BSGR would relinquish its rights to Simandou but maintain an interest in the Zogota deposit. This was to be developed by Mick Davis at the head of Niron Metals, founded in 2018, after a payment of $50 million to the Guinean government. Davis walked away from the company in 2021, the Financial Times reporting that people with knowledge of the situation said "Davis had come to the view that it could take many years before Niron would be able to secure a route to market for Zogota’s iron ore and that he wanted to focus on other projects”.

Personal life
His wife Barbara is a solicitor. They live in London with their three children, Sarah, Ronit and Eitan.

Honours
In the 2015 Queen's Birthday Honours, he was appointed a Knight Bachelor 'for services to Holocaust Commemoration and 
Education'.

He holds an honorary doctorate from Bar Ilan University.

References

1958 births
Living people
British accountants
British chief executives
British corporate directors
British Jews
Businesspeople awarded knighthoods
Conservative Party (UK) people
Knights Bachelor
Rhodes University alumni
Royal Botanic Gardens, Kew
South African Jews
Xstrata